Clontarf (Irish: Cluain Tarbh, meaning "meadow of the bull") is a suburb of northern Sydney, in the state of New South Wales, Australia. Clontarf is located 13 kilometres north-east of the Sydney central business district in the local government area of Northern Beaches Council, in the Northern Beaches region.

Landmarks
Clontarf's landmarks are Clontarf Beach, Sandy Bay, Castle Rock and Grotto Point.

History
Clontarf is named after the Clontarf district in Dublin, Ireland.

The son of Queen Victoria, Prince Alfred, Duke of Edinburgh, visited Clontarf in 1868 where he was shot in the back by an Irishman, Henry James O'Farrell. Alfred was saved because the bullet struck him at a point where his India-rubber braces, holding his trousers up, crossed over. The bullet was deflected around his rib-cage and did no major harm.

Name legacy

In February 2021 Transport for NSW advised that one of the series 2 Emerald-class ferries to commence service on the Manly ferry service, around the middle of 2021, would be named Clontarf after Clontarf Beach.

Demographics
According to the 2016 census, there were 1,737 residents in Clontarf. Sixty-three per cent of people were born in Australia. The next most common country of birth was England at 11.9%. Eighty-one per cent of people only spoke English at home. The most common responses for religion were No Religion 31.5%, Catholic 23.4% and Anglican 21.4%.

The median age was 44 years, compared to the national median of 38 years, while children aged under 15 years made up 21.1% of the population (national average is 18.7%) and people aged 65 years and over made up 16.1% of the population (national average is 15.8%). The median household income in Clontarf was $3,744 per week, which is more than double the national median of $1,438. With high incomes, Clontarf residents also have high housing costs. The median mortgage payment was $4,333 per month compared to $1,755 for all of Australia. The story is similar for rented properties—the median weekly rent was $1,200 compared to $335 for all of Australia.

Notes

References
The Book of Sydney Suburbs, Compiled by Frances Pollen, Angus & Robertson Publishers, 1990, Published in Australia

External links
  [CC-By-SA]

Suburbs of Sydney
Northern Beaches Council